In ancient Rome the Latin word adlocutio means an address given by a general, usually the emperor, to his massed army and legions, and a general form of Roman salute from the army to their leader. The research of adlocutio focuses on the art of statuary and coinage aspects. It is often portrayed in sculpture, either simply as a single, life-size contrapposto figure of the general with his arm outstretched, or a relief scene of the general on a podium addressing the army. Such relief scenes also frequently appear on imperial coinage. 

The adlocutio is one of the most widely represented formulas of Roman art. The convention is regularly shown in individual figures like the famous Augustus of Prima Porta or can be put into a narrative context as seen in the Aurelian panel. Gestures and body language are crucial for the study of adlocutio in ancient times, as addressing to thousands of soldiers was less penetrable by voice compared to body language and gestures which were more powerful, infectiously raising the army's enthusiasm. Characteristic of the formula is the outstretched hand of speech as well as the contrapposto pose with the weight clearly shifted to one leg. Much information about adlocutio can be interpreted by these sculptures.

The Augustus of Prima Porta 

The outstretched right hand raised by Augustus can be seen as power and authority, even in the point of view of gods in ancient Rome, right hand represents divinity, and this characteristic is also illustrated by Cancelleria Reliefs with the emperor's right hand raised among the gods. The bare feet of Augustus may seems incongruous as compared with the cuirassed details in the chest. This indicates the heroicization of Augustus could be posthumous. This feature also adds civilian portrait to the statue besides military aspect. The small Cupid besides the right leg claims the divine lineage and status. The breastplate relief in front of him depicts the gods. The spear in the left hand is a symbol of Augustus' ruling power over the empire.

Roman coinage 
Many Roman AE/As coins are with adlocutio of emperors. The coinages of adlocutio tell the differences between the ways each emperor addressing the army.

AE of Caligula with adlocutio cohortium 

The term "ADLOCVT COH" refers to adlocutio cohortium, which means the address given by the emperor towards the cohorts as the AE coin is presenting. Notice the typical gesture of Caligula: outstretching raised-arm salute, kneeling left leg. The soldiers are standing in a compact line.

AE of Nero with adlocutio 

In the coin AE of Nero with adlocutio, soldiers are standing in more scattered position compared to those who are depicted in AE of Caligula with adlocutio, which are adhering in a mass. Also the weakened architectural background and the sheltering roof covering soldiers and their commander can be interpreted as more amiable atmosphere between Nero and his soldiers. Notice that Nero is not standing alone on the platform, there is the Praetorian prefect who stands behind him.

Panel relief of Marcus Aurelius 
This panel presents an integral angle looking at adlocutio scene. On this panel depicting the adlocutio event, emperor Marcus Aurelius is doing an adlocutio toward the army with his son-in-law Pompeianus standing behind him as an adviser, making Marcus Aurelius stand out as the leader, the imperator of the army.

Salute from the army 

The Roman salute in military contexts, is often seen as the right hands raised from the soldiers to their leader's head. As depicted in the Trajan's Column, Scenes LXXXIV-LXXXV. Trajan conducting sacrifice, half of the crowd raise arms extended straight and another half bent at the elbow. Among the straight arms, one palm is open but held vertically; on the others, both thumb and index fingers are extended with others bent back. And for the hands of the bent arm, their fingers on the hands are pointing downwards. The adlocutio scenes depicted in sculpture and on coins and medallions are almost identical to this raised-arm salute. The first-century-A.D. teacher of rhetoric and author of most Roman oratory handbook, Quintilian has discussed about the hand and arm gestures, the emperor's raised hands carry the message of mighty force of absolute power to his soldiers and civilians, and when a hand is raised above shoulder height, the gesture is probably signalling the warning as "illa cava et rara et super umeri altitudinem elata ... velut hortatrix manus." . This information might be the historical origin to Nazi Germany's straight-arm salute.

Use of the adlocutio pose
Due to the widely recognized connection between the adlocutio pose and the ideas of power and authority, the raised and extended right hand has been used on a number of statues of leaders and thinkers in recent years. These include: Saddam Hussein, Kim Il-Sung, Vladimir Lenin, Joseph Stalin, Mao Zedong, Captain James Cook, Marcus Aurelius and Augustus to name a few.

References

External links
Dictionary of Roman Coins (on Numiswiki)
ARTH
https://www.oneonta.edu/faculty/farberas/arth/arth200/politics/aurelian_panels.html

Military of ancient Rome